Hello=Fire is the debut album of Dean Fertita's solo project with the same name. The album was recorded at various studios while Fertita was on tour with Queens of the Stone Age. The album features guest appearances by band members from Queens of the Stone Age, Brendan Benson who also produced the album as well as The Afghan Whigs drummer Michael Horrigan. The album was released October 26, 2009 by Schnitzel Records Ltd.  "Nature Of Our Minds" was released as its first single.

Track listing
All tracks written by Dean Fertita except where noted.

Personnel

Mixed by Dave Feeny, Tempermill Studio

Recorded by:
Brendan Benson - East Grand Studio
Bryan Hanna - Terrarium Studio
Dave Feeny - Tempermill Studio
Norm Block - Happy Ending Studio
Eldad Guetta - Shriek Studio, London

Performed by:
Dean Fertita - vocals, guitar, keyboard
Brendan Benson - bass, vocals, guitar
Michael Horrigan - drums
Joey Castillo - drums
Troy Van Leeuwen - bass
Michael Shuman - bass, vocals

Design - Tal Brosh

References
Travis Keller Hello=Fire is Dean Fertita. New video + album info  buddyhead.com Retrieved: 2010-01-23
Heron Hello=Fire: The debut album from Dean Fertita and Friends hangouts.altsounds.com Retrieved:2010-01-23
Edgar Smith < Hello=Fire album review loudandquiet.com Retrieved: 2010-01-23

2009 albums